Chilades eleusis, the sky-blue Cupid, is a butterfly in the family Lycaenidae. It is found in Senegal, the Gambia, Guinea-Bissau, Burkina Faso, northern Ghana, northern Nigeria, Niger, northern Cameroon, Chad, Sudan and Egypt. The habitat consists of dry habitats, Sudanian Savanna and the Sahel.

Adults feed from low-growing flowers.

The larvae feed on Acacia species.

References

Butterflies described in 1888
Chilades
Butterflies of Africa